Robert Fudali may refer to:

 Rob Darken (born Robert Fudali), Polish heavy metal singer and guitarist
 Robert F. Fudali, American geochemist